Submarine Squadron 17 (also known as SUBRON 17) is a squadron of submarines of the United States Navy based in Bangor, Washington under the command of Captain Charles McLenithan. The submarines that make up SUBRON 17 include:
 
 
 
 
 
USS Nebraska (SSBN-739)

Notes

See also
 History of the United States Navy

External links
  Official webpage.

Submarine squadrons of the United States Navy